This is a list of diplomatic missions in Morocco. There are currently 113 embassies in Rabat, and many countries maintain consulates in other Moroccan cities (not including honorary consulates). Several other nations have embassies accredited to Morocco but resident in other capitals.

Diplomatic missions in Rabat

Embassies

Other missions or delegations 
 (Delegation)
 (Liaison Office - to be upgraded into an embassy)
 (Government Office)

Gallery

Consular missions

Agadir 
 (Consulate General)
 (Consulate General)

Casablanca 

 (Consulate-General)

 (Consulate-General)

 (Consulate-General)

 (Consulate-General)

Dakhla, Western Sahara

Fez

Larache
 (Consulate General)

Laayoune, Western Sahara

 (Consulate General)

Marrakesh

Nador
 (Consulate General)

Tangier

 (Consulate General)
 (Consulate General)

Tétouan 
 (Consulate General)

Non-resident embassies accredited to Morocco 

Resident in Cairo, Egypt:

Resident in Lisbon, Portugal:

Resident in Madrid, Spain:

 

Resident in Paris, France:

Resident in other cities:

 (Tripoli)
 (Addis Ababa)
 (Riyadh)
 (Kuwait City)
 (Kuwait City)
 (Geneva)
 (Valletta)
 (San Marino)
 (Singapore)
 (Ankara)
 (Tripoli)
 (Riyadh)
 (Accra)

Embassies to open

Former embassies

See also 
 Foreign relations of Morocco
 List of diplomatic missions of Morocco

References

External links 
 Ministry of Foreign Affairs of Morocco

List
Morocco
Diplomatic missions